Fred Scerni (born February 18, 1948) is an American politician who served in the New Jersey General Assembly from the 2nd Legislative District from 1990 to 1992.

References

1948 births
Living people
Democratic Party members of the New Jersey General Assembly
Politicians from Atlantic City, New Jersey